The Crawl is a live album by the Louis Hayes Sextet, recorded at Birdland in 1989 and released on the Candid label.

Reception 

The AllMusic review stated: "With interesting modal originals to blow on, in addition to a blues and a pair of standards, this live session from 1989 has many memorable moments".

Track listing 
 "Escape Velocity" (Clint Houston) – 6:20
 "The Crawl" (Mickey Tucker) – 9:21
 "Yesterdays" (Jerome Kern, Otto Harbach) – 8:42 	
 "Run Before the Sun" (Houston) – 10:00
 "Autumn in New York" (Vernon Duke) – 7:50
 "Blues in Five Dimensions" (Tucker) – 10:47
 "Bushman Song" (John Stubblefield) – 13:08

Personnel 
Louis Hayes – drums
Charles Tolliver – trumpet
Gary Bartz – alto saxophone
John Stubblefield – tenor saxophone
Mickey Tucker – piano
Clint Houston – bass

References 

Louis Hayes albums
1990 live albums
Candid Records live albums
Live jazz albums